Rolf Thomas Lorenz (born 19 May 1959 in Klingenthal) is a German composer and music teacher.

Life 
From 1974 to 1982 Lorenz received composition lessons from Jürgen Golle in Zwickau. From 1978 to 1982 he studied composition, clarinet and piano at the conservatory "Carl Maria von Weber" in Dresden with Wilfried Krätzschmar, Josef Oehl, and Hermann W. Finke. Since 1982 Lorenz has been teaching clarinet, composition and music theory at the Heinrich-Schütz-Conservatory Dresden, and he also works as a freelance composer. Since 2004 he has been chairman of the Dresden working group of the German Composers' Association.

Prizes 
 1.

Compositions 
 Kaleidoskop für 4 B-Klarinetten und Bassklarinette. Musikverlag Friedrich Hofmeister, Leipzig
 Columbus Skteches for Columbus Symphony Youth Orchestra, 2001
 Solo della ramificazione 1982/2003 for clarinet, Musikverlag Breitkopf & Härtel, Leipzig
 3 Nocturnes pour clarinette solo 2010/11, self edition
 Drei Bagatellen für 2 Trompeten und 3 Posaunen, 2000, Musikverlag Friedrich Hofmeister, Leipzig
 Sonate für Klarinette und Klavier, 1984, Musikverlag Friedrich Hofmeister, Leipzig
 Divertimento für Klarinettenseptett, 1986, Musikverlag Johann Kliment KG, Vienna
 Toccata für Akkordeon, 2006, Musikverlag Friedrich Hofmeister, Leipzig
 Sonatine für Trompete und Klavier. 2000, Musikverlag Bruno Uetz, Halberstadt
 Swingin Sketch for clarinet and piano 2011
 Capriccio für Bassett horn solo. 2012, Edition Andel, Belgien
 Summer Days for recorder quintet, 2012, Edition Andel, Belgien
 Capriccio für Flöte und Klavier 2013, for Iwona Glinka, Athens,
 Tarantella für Klarinette und Klavier. 2013 Edition Andel, Belgium
 Impressionen für Flöte und Klavier, Edition Andel, Belgium
 Capriccietto für Klarinette und Klavier, Verlag Johann Kliment KG, Vienna
 Mein erstes Konzert. for clarinet and piano, Verlag Johann Kliment KG
 3 Stücke für Hornquartett, Musikverlag Johann Kliment KG
 Dresdner Festmarsch for the 800th anniversary of Dresden for wind orchestra, Musikverlag Johann Kliment
 3 Bagatellen für Flöte und Klavier, Edition Andel, Belgien
 Suite für 4 Gitarren, manuscript
 Sonate für Trompete und Klavier, Edition Andel, Belgien
 Suite für Zupforchester, Ebert-Verlag Leipzig,Commissioned by the Landeszupforchester Sachsen
Sonatine für Horn und Klavier
Sonatine für Fagott und Klavier

References

External links 
 

20th-century German composers
1959 births
Living people
People from Klingenthal